is a Japanese former international table tennis player.

Born in Shōnai, Saito represented Japan in table tennis at the 1988 Summer Olympics. In the singles event he went 5–2 in the group stage, but missed out on qualifying for the knockout rounds, finishing third in his group.

References

External links
 

1962 births
Living people
Japanese male table tennis players
Olympic table tennis players of Japan
Table tennis players at the 1988 Summer Olympics
Asian Games medalists in table tennis
Asian Games silver medalists for Japan
Asian Games bronze medalists for Japan
Table tennis players at the 1982 Asian Games
Table tennis players at the 1986 Asian Games
Medalists at the 1982 Asian Games
Medalists at the 1986 Asian Games
Sportspeople from Yamagata Prefecture